The women's 100 metres event at the 2007 European Athletics U23 Championships was held in Debrecen, Hungary, at Gyulai István Atlétikai Stadion on 12 and 13 July.

Medalists

Results

Final
13 July
Wind: -2.0 m/s

Semifinals
12 July
Qualified: first 4 in each heat to the Final

Semifinal 1
Wind: 0.8 m/s

Semifinal 2
Wind: 0.3 m/s

Heats
12 July
Qualified: first 2 in each heat and 6 best to the Semifinals

Heat 1
Wind: 1.2 m/s

Heat 2
Wind: 1.7 m/s

Heat 3
Wind: 1.0 m/s

Heat 4
Wind: 1.8 m/s

Heat 5
Wind: 0.6 m/s

Participation
According to an unofficial count, 31 athletes from 20 countries participated in the event.

 (1)
 (1)
 (1)
 (1)
 (2)
 (3)
 (1)
 (1)
 (1)
 (3)
 (1)
 (1)
 (2)
 (1)
 (2)
 (1)
 (2)
 (2)
 (3)
 (1)

References

100 metres
100 metres at the European Athletics U23 Championships